The 1960 NCAA College Division football season was the fifth season of college football in the United States organized by the National Collegiate Athletic Association at the NCAA College Division level.

Conference standings

Rankings

Small college poll
In 1960, both United Press International (UPI) and the Associated Press (AP) conducted "small college" polls. This was the first year that the AP (polling a panel of  eight "selectors" from NCAA districts) conducted their poll, and the third year that UPI (polling a panel of coaches) conducted their poll.  Both wire services named the Ohio Bobcats – who had a record of 10–0, registered five shutouts, and held all their opponents to eight points or less – as the number one team.

United Press International (coaches) final poll
Published on November 25

Rankings were published without records.

Associated Press (writers) final poll
Published on December 1

See also
 1960 NCAA University Division football season
 1960 NAIA football season

References